In the 1990s in Morocco gradual political reforms culminated in the constitutional reform of 1996, which created a new bicameral legislature with expanded, although still limited, powers. Although reportedly marred by irregularities, elections for the Chamber of Representatives were held in 1997. With the death of King Hassan II of Morocco in 1999, the more liberal-minded Crown Prince Sidi Mohammed, who assumed the title of Mohammed VI, took the throne. He has since enacted successive reforms to modernize Morocco, and the country has seen a marked improvement in its human rights record. One of the new king's first acts was to free some 8,000 political prisoners and reduce the sentences of another 30,000. He also established a commission to compensate families of missing political activists and others subjected to arbitrary detention.

Beginning the final decade of his notoriously conservative rule, King Hassan II continued the pattern of oppressing political opposition. Systematically jailing and silencing his opponents through state run forces, many of which were kept at the secret political prison Tazmamart for often indefinite and undetermined lengths of time, Hassan was not opposed to extreme measures to enforce his rule.

Despite efforts to hide the abuses from the outside world, King Hassan continued to receive backlash from International watch groups and human rights advocacy organizations in which his methods were put into the spotlight unnerving him and creating the need for action to be taken. In 1990 Hassan met with representatives from the human rights advocacy group Amnesty International in what was initially believed to be a step towards reforms in Moroccan policy. However hopes of a freer Morocco were dashed after Amnesty International published a report on Morocco alleging human rights abuses performed by the state.

Later that year Hassan continued his crackdown on political opposition to the state with the prosecution of members of the Islamic group Al Adl Wa Al Ihssane, a largely peaceful Islamic group which pushes for the Islamisation of society through education and awareness rather than violence. Accusing members of belonging to and attempting to advertise for the unsanctioned association, roughly 40 members of Al Adl Wa Al Ihssane were charged leading to at least 30 convictions. Some of which due to appeals and efforts by the defense were either overturned or had sentences commuted. The trials themselves were marred by accusations of corruption as reports of judicial malpractice arose. Accounts of enforcement officers violating procedures in regard to what constitutes lawful and unlawful searches as well as the falsification of official documents called into question the legitimacy of these arrests and the independence of the Moroccan judiciary as a whole.

Upon discovery of the use of torture as a method of interrogation by state officials, there arose new ammunition for advocacy groups aiming to overturn convictions as well as pressure the government into enacting more protections of civil rights for the Moroccan people. Questions as to the reliability of confessions provided a basis for appeals to courts and were covered by the media, however due to governmental influence courts largely turned a blind eye to any reported case of torture.

In response to the negative media coverage plaguing the regime, Moroccan courts began targeting media outlets more severely with charges of defamation against state run organizations. Convictions for the "defamation of the courts and tribunals" followed swiftly as several high-profile media figures faced imprisonment including the director of "Al-Ittihad al-Ishtiraki", the publication of the main opposition party at the time, Ahmed Bendjelloun of "at-Tariq" as well as Mustaphe el-Alaoui, director of "al-Usbu' as-Sahafa w'as-Siyasi". All three faced several months in jails due to stories published in which the ability and independence of the courts were brought into question. While the sentences were short, four months for Benjelloun and three months for el-Alaoui, the message that was conveyed to the governments opposition was clear, any attempts to deviate from the message approved by Hassan would not be welcome in Morocco.

Shortly after the attack on the press, the Moroccan government found itself at war with once again with international human rights watch dogs. Amnesty International, the organization that had previously sent representatives to meet with Hassan, had its legitimacy as an organization attacked by defenders of the regime. Claims that the human rights group misrepresented facts in its reporting of the conditions of prisoners and political oppression arose and were widely circulated among the Moroccan people leading to support for the regime. The skewed information made it easier for  the  regime to deny entry to and expel those who disagreed with their practices, such as representatives from the French group the "Association for victims of Repression in Exile". In 1990 two members were expelled from Moroccan soil on accusations of intending to violate their travel visas. The same representatives had previously been harassed by Moroccan officials on a separate trip. In this incident the representative had her items seized and searched by security officials, confiscating all evidence of human rights abuses from her luggage as well as intimidating her in the process.

Despite past actions, in an attempt to rectify his public image King Hassan formed a new task force to assess the validity of the accusations made by watchdog groups. The so-called "Consultative Council on Human Rights" was used more as tool of the regime to tell the world that conditions for political prisoners in Morocco was not as the many international watch dog groups had reported. However Hassan did begin a process of releasing prisoners due to mounting pressure from international organizations and foreign governments, with over three hundred released in 1991 alone.

References